North Pitt High School is a high school located in the town of Bethel in Pitt County, North Carolina, United States.

History
North Pitt opened in 1970 as the consolidated high school for the "north of the river" area of Pitt County. North Pitt, as an integrated high school, was the new school for the Belvoir, Bethel, Pactolus, Stokes, and Staton House areas, all of which made up the vast farming areas north of the Tar River. Belvoir, Bethel, and Stokes-Pactolus High Schools sent all their students that year to the school, which was headed by Principal Walter Latham and Assistant Principal E.R. McNair—who was one of the earliest black administrators in the county and still works at North Pitt, now as a substitute teacher after retiring. The school was a sister school to cross county D. H. Conley High School in Greenville and has grown in size from its original two and a half hallway design to now include four major hallways, one vocational wing, and two outside field houses.

Notable alumni
Greg Briley, former MLB player for the Seattle Mariners and Florida Marlins
Ashley Sheppard, former NFL linebacker (attended North Pitt before transferring to Fork Union Military Academy)

References

Public high schools in North Carolina
Schools in Pitt County, North Carolina